Franz Grainer (born 28 September 1871 in Bad Reichenhall, died 1948 in Munich) was a Bavarian photographer.

Career 
Grainer created numerous portraits of the children of the last crown prince of Bavaria, Rupprecht, especially the firstborn Luitpold and the son Albrecht, who was the only one to reach adulthood. In 1919, he was one of the founding members of the Gesellschaft Deutscher Lichtbildner (GDL), the predecessor of the German Academy of Photographs, whose chairmanship he later took over and still held in the power takeover of the National Socialists.

In addition to portrait photographs, more and more nude studies emerged in the 1920s. Works by Grainer are held at the Museum Folkwang in Essen and the Fotomuseum in the Munich Stadtmuseum.

Works 
From the wild. Thierstudien from the high Alps in snapshots by Franz Grainer bayer. Hofphotograph, Berlin 1898
The modern female portrait, in: Das Deutsche Lichtbild. Year 1927, Berlin 1927

Portrait gallery

References 
Sandra Limbacher: Photography as a means of social representation. The Munich portrait photographer Franz Grainer (1871-1949). Master thesis, Munich o. J. (between 1985 and 2005).
Wilhelm Schöppe (Hrsg.): Master of the Camera. How they became and how they work. Hugo Erfurth , Franz Fiedler , Franz Grainer, Kurt Hilescher , Erna Lendvai-Dircksen , Prof. Walter Hefe, Albert Renger-Patzsch , Dr. Paul Wolff , Adolf Lazi , Dr. Martin Hürlimann , Willy Zielke , Ms A. von Blücher. With 48 picture reproductions. Wilhelm Knapp, Halle-Saale, oj. (1935?).
Two masters have left us (Hugo Erfurth - Franz Grainer). In: photo mirror. Issue 7/8, April/May 1948.

External links 
National Portrait Gallery Franz Grainer
Getty images

Photographers from Bavaria
1871 births
1948 deaths
People from Bad Reichenhall